Thomas Pond is adjacent to U.S. Route 302 on the border of Raymond and Casco, Maine. The shoreline is heavily developed with residences and seasonal cabins, and there is a boat launching area near the highway where the pond overflows into Sebago Lake. White perch, chain pickerel, smallmouth bass, and largemouth bass thrive in the shallow portions of the pond; and land-locked Atlantic salmon use the deeper parts of the pond preying on rainbow smelt.

Sources

Lakes of Cumberland County, Maine
Raymond, Maine
Casco, Maine
Reservoirs in Maine